Allogaster aethiopicus is a species of cerambycid from the tribe Achrysonini. They are mainly found in Ethiopia.

References

Achrysonini
Arthropods of Ethiopia